Golden Folk Hits is an album by American singer Bobby Darin, released in 1963.

Reception

In his Allmusic review, critic JT Griffith called it “One of the most underappreciated Bobby Darin albums and one of the most exciting to revisit.” Billboard commented "...lends his gusto and bravado to a powerful line-up of contemporary folk hits."

Track listing
"Mary Don't You Weep" (Traditional)
"Where Have All the Flowers Gone?" (Pete Seeger)
"If I Had a Hammer" (Lee Hays, Seeger)
"Don't Think Twice, It's All Right" (Bob Dylan)
"Greenback Dollar" (Hoyt Axton, Kennard Ramsey)
"Why, Daddy, Why" (Bobby Scott)
"Michael Row the Boat Ashore" (Traditional)
"Abilene" (Les Brown, John D. Loudermilk)
"Green, Green" (Barry McGuire, Randy Sparks)
"Settle Down (Goin' Down That Highway)" (Mike Settle)
"Blowin' in the Wind" (Dylan)
"Train to the Sky" (Ben Raleigh)

Personnel
Bobby Darin – vocals
Glen Campbell, Roger McGuinn, James Burton – guitar
Walter Raim – arrangements

References

1963 albums
Bobby Darin albums
Albums produced by Nick Venet
Capitol Records albums